William Watson is an American former Negro league outfielder who played in the 1920s.

Watson played for the Brooklyn Royal Giants in 1925. In 35 recorded games, he posted 31 hits in 143 plate appearances.

References

External links
 and Seamheads

Year of birth missing
Place of birth missing
Brooklyn Royal Giants players
Baseball outfielders